Genetic variation may refer to 

Genetic diversity
Genetic variability
Genetic variance
Genetic variation
Genetic variant (disambiguation)